The 2015 African U-17 Championship was the 11th edition of the biennial international youth football tournament organized by the Confederation of African Football (CAF) for players aged 17 and below. The tournament took place in Niamey, Niger, and was originally scheduled to be held between 2 and 16 May. However, the date of the opening match was pushed forward to 15 February, with the tournament scheduled to conclude with the final on 1 March.

The semi-finalists of the tournament qualified for the 2015 FIFA U-17 World Cup in Chile. Mali won the tournament, and were joined by South Africa, Guinea, and Nigeria as CAF qualifiers for the 2015 FIFA U-17 World Cup.

Qualification

The qualifiers were played between June and September 2014. At the end of the qualification phase, seven teams joined the hosts Niger.

Player eligibility
During CAF Executive Committee meetings held on 21 and 22 September 2013, the CAF Medical Committee was instructed to continue the use of magnetic resonance imaging (MRI) scans to determine the ages of players and consequently their eligibility to participate in the qualifying stages of the tournament. It was also directed to ensure the authenticity of the process as well as the identity of the players involved.

Qualified teams
 
 
 
 
  (hosts)

Disqualified
 Team Ghana was disqualified on 26 October, after medical test provided by the African Confederation after their first leg play off victory against Cameroon found that one of their players failed age eligibility confirmations. Ghana appealed but failed.

Venues

Match officials
The referees were:

Referees

 Mustapha Ghorbal
 Helder Martins de Carvalho
 Antoine Max Depadoux Effa Essouma
 Ali Mohamed Adelaid
 Lazard Tsiba Kamba
 Jean-Jacques Ndala Ngambo
 Joaquin Esono Eyang
 Noureddine El Jaafari
 Gomno Daouda
 Ferdinand Anietie Udoh
 Daouda Kebe
 Kokou Hougnimon Fagla
 Denis Batte

Assistant referees

 Babadjide Bienvenu Dina
 Soulaimane Amaldine
 Ahmed Hossam Taha
 Temesgin Samuel Atango
 Marius Donatien Tan
 Abdoulaye Sylla
 Gilbert Cheruiyot
 Souru Phatsoane
 Arsénio Chadreque Marengula
 Abdourahamane Diarra Soumana
 Ababacar Sene
 Serigne Cheikh Toure
 Hamza Hagi Abdi
 Mohammed Abdallah Ibrahim
 Majed Rhouma
 Tapfumanei Mutengwa

Draw
The draw for the final tournament was held on 21 December 2014, 11:00 UTC+02:00, at the CAF Headquarters in Cairo, Egypt. Niger and Ivory Coast were seeded and placed into Groups A and B respectively.

Squads

Each team can register a squad of 21 players (three of whom must be goalkeepers).

Group stage
The group winners and runners-up advanced to the semi-finals and qualified for the 2015 FIFA U-17 World Cup.

Tiebreakers
The teams are ranked according to points (3 points for a win, 1 point for a draw, 0 points for a loss). If tied on points, tiebreakers are applied in the following order:

Number of points obtained in games between the teams concerned;
Goal difference in games between the teams concerned;
Goals scored in games between the teams concerned;
Goal difference in all games;
Goals scored in all games;
Fair Play point system in which the number of yellow and red cards are evaluated;
Drawing of lots.

All times UTC+01:00.

Group A

Group B

Knockout stage
In the knockout stages, if a match is level at the end of normal playing time, kicks from the penalty mark are used to determine the winner (no extra time shall be played).

Semi-finals

Third place match

Final

Goalscorers
4 goals
 Victor Osimhen

3 goals

 Aboubacar Touré
 Boubacar Traoré
 Kelechi Nwakali

2 goals

 Christian Bayemi
 Abdoulaye Jules Keita
 Idrissa Doumbia
 Sekou Koita
 Aly Malle
 Nelson Maluleke
 Eric Mayo
 Patson Daka

1 goal

 Martin Hongla
 N'guessan Jonas Kouadio
 Koffi Kouao
 Naby Bangoura
 Sam Diallo
 Siaka Bagayoko
 Sidiki Maiga
 Mamadou Sangaré
 Issoufou Boubabcar
 Malick Saidou Gonda
 Ismael Rabiou Lara
 Sibongakonke Mbatha
 Luvuyo Katlego Mkatshana
 Katlego Mohamme
 Wayne Museba

Own goal

 Fokem Achille (against South Africa)

See also
2015 African U-20 Championship

References

External links
11th Edition of the African U-17 Championship, CAFonline.com

 
2015
U-17 Championship
International association football competitions hosted by Niger
2015 in youth association football